The Hefei–Wuhan high-speed railway (also referred to in Chinese as the Hewu high-speed railway) is  a high-speed railway line between  and  currently under construction in China. Construction is expected to start in 2022 and be completed in 2027. It will parallel the higher-speed Hefei–Wuhan railway.

References 

High-speed railway lines in China
High-speed railway lines under construction